Tahira Wasti (Punjabi) (1944 – March 11, 2012) was a well-known Pakistani writer and television actress. She is best known for portrayal of Isabella of Castile in the TV drama Shaheen.

Early life
Tahira was born in 1944 at Sargodha, Punjab, (British India) now in Pakistan. She received her early education from Sargodha and later she moved to Lahore for higher education then Karachi.

Career
Tahira Wasti started her career with writing articles in a magazine at the age of 16 and she also worked as an English newscaster on PTV News in 1964. Tahira started working at Pakistan Television Corporation in 1968 by acting in a TV drama serial Jaib Katra based on a novel by Saadat Hasan Manto. She appeared in a number of TV dramas from 1968 until the 1990s, most of them have become classics of PTV such as Kashkol, Jaangloos and Daldal. Her prominent personality made her famous for playing regal roles suitable for representing royal, feudal or upper-class families, as in TV plays like Tipu Sultan: The Tiger Lord, Shaheen and Aakhri Chatan.

She also wrote plays for television and showed special interest in science fiction.

Personal life
She was the wife of TV actor and English language newscaster Rizwan Wasti and was mother of TV actress Laila Wasti. Maria Wasti a famous TV actress is her niece.

Illness and death
Tahira had developed heart ailments, depression because of her husband's death and diabets. She died of natural causes on March 11, 2012, in Karachi, at the age of 68.

Filmography

Television series
 Shama
 Aakhri Chatan
 Afshan
 Daldal
 Fishaar
 Jaib Katra - 1968
 Jaangloos
 Kashkol - 1990s
 Shaheen
 Raat
 Andhera Ujala
 Tipu Sultan: The Tiger Lord
 Pyas
 Harjai
 Fanooni Lateefay
 Dil, Diya, Dehleez
 Maamta  
 Shanakht
 Moorat  
 Doraha
 Raat Gaye
 StarNite
 Deewana
 Harjaee
 Aakhri Chatan
 Aawazain
 Chand Grehan
 Dil Ki Dehleez Par
 Nadan Nadia
 Khaleej
 Shaam Se Pehlay (PTV drama serial)
 Noori Jam Tamachi
 Heer Waris Shah (PTV drama serial)
 Bushra Bushra
 Damad House
 Parsa
 Pukaar

Telefilm
 Operation Dwarka 1965
 Uss Ki Biwi (a telefilm)
 Karwat

Film
 Kyun Tum Say Itna Pyar Hai

Honour
In 2021 on August 16 the Government of Pakistan named a street and intersection after her in Lahore.

Awards and nominations

References

External links 
 

1944 births
2012 deaths
Pakistani television actresses
People from Sargodha District
Punjabi people
Pakistani television writers
Actresses from Karachi
Writers from Karachi
Pakistani dramatists and playwrights
20th-century Pakistani actresses
Pakistani film actresses
21st-century Pakistani actresses
Women television writers
Pakistani television newsreaders and news presenters